Lower Learning is a 2008 American black comedy film starring Jason Biggs, Eva Longoria, Rob Corddry, Ryan Newman, Monica Potter, and Andy Pessoa. It was directed by Mark Lafferty, and written by Lafferty and Shahin Chandrasoma. The film's original score was composed by Ryan Shore.

Plot
Geraldine Ferraro Elementary, one of the worst schools in the state, is in danger of being closed. The school suffers from low test results, drunken teachers, and a corrupt Principal. The Vice Principal, Tom Willoman (Jason Biggs), decides to try to save the school. When he finds out that the school inspector is a childhood friend, he recruits her to help him save the school, by rallying the teachers and students against the principal.

Cast
 Jason Biggs as Vice Principal Tom Willoman
 Eva Longoria as Rebecca Seabrook
 Rob Corddry as Principal Harper Billings
 Monica Potter as Laura Buchwald
 Will Sasso as Jesse Buchwald
 Nat Faxon as Turner Abernathy
 Jill Latiano as Nurse Gretchyn
 Kyle Gass as Decatur Doublewide
 Hayes MacArthur as Digdug O'Shaughnessy
 Zachary Gordon as Frankie Fowler
 Ed Helms as Maurice Bunting
 Patricia Belcher as Colette Bamboo
 Jack Donner as Old Curt
 Sandy Martin as Olympia Parpadelle
 Erik Palladino as Smooth Bob Willoman
 Matt Walsh as Mr. Conroy
 Miranda Bailey as Melody
 Ryan Newman as Carlotta
 Andy Pessoa as Walter
 Kiernan Shipka as Sarah

Release
Lower Learning was released theatrically at a single theater showing on October 10, 2008, and made $2,804 in domestic grosses.

Home media
The film was released on DVD on December 2, 2008.

References

External links
 
 
 
 

2008 films
2008 comedy films
American comedy films
Films about educators
Films scored by Ryan Shore
2000s English-language films
2000s American films